Hinge is a dating app that claims to be the only dating app that emphasizes long-term connections between users. It is aimed towards a younger demographic than Match.com and eHarmony, such as the demographic using Tinder. The app was fully owned by Match Group as of February 2019.

History
In 2011, founder and CEO Justin McLeod (alongside a team including Frances Haugen) founded a desktop service called Secret Agent Cupid, which allowed users to connect to Facebook and list which of their friends they had crushes on. Throughout 2012, this became a mobile application called Hinge, which launched in February 2013. The application was designed to be less superficial than Tinder, forgoing Tinder-like swiping actions and branding itself as "the relationship app". Before Hinge gained enough users to sustain the business, the company nearly ran out of funding. When making the app, McLeod spent much of the remaining money on a launch party in Washington, D.C., which enabled the company to obtain the next round of funding, saving it from insolvency.

Throughout 2017, Hinge received more mentions than any other dating app in the "Weddings" section of The New York Times. Hinge Matchmaker was released in September 2017, claiming to reinvent online dating for "people that missed out on the dating app craze". Match Group made investments in Hinge as early as September 2017. In June 2018, Match Group acquired 51% ownership of Hinge, with the right to acquire all remaining shares within a year, and came to own 100% of Hinge by the first quarter of 2019. The purchase attracted some criticism from antitrust advocates, who see it as indicative of a larger trend toward monopolization in the technology industry.

The application's popularity was boosted in 2019 when U.S. presidential candidate Pete Buttigieg revealed that he had met his husband on Hinge. Also in 2019, the company started Hinge Labs to research successful matches and fine-tune the app's compatibility algorithm and other features. Hinge was featured on CNET as one of the best dating sites for 2021. A voice message feature was added to the app in October 2021.

Operation

Presented in a vertical timeline, profiles on Hinge are composed of up to six pictures, alongside three self-selected personal prompts which encourage users to focus on personality traits rather than solely appearance. Instead of swiping, users must "like" specific photos or prompts if they wish to reach out to other members, though they are not required to respond to these photos or prompts. Hinge allows users to filter matches based on traits that it believes are important to users, such as religion or height. Other traits that may be important to users, such as body type or whether someone is more introverted or extroverted, are not included.

Unlike other dating apps, users can message other users without first requiring a "match". As a ghosting countermeasure, a "Your Turn" feature reminds a user to continue a conversation. In 2018, in order to find more compatible matches, Hinge launched a "We Met" feature which allows members to privately confirm that they have at least had a first date with a particular match.

In July 2018, Hinge rolled out its "most compatible" feature, which uses the Gale–Shapley algorithm to recommend one user per day that Hinge claims is the best pairing, determined by their likes and passes. Hinge formerly used Facebook friend lists to facilitate connections. However, in 2018, the app moved away from using friends of friends as a predictor of compatibility and was redesigned to no longer require Facebook.

Marketing
Hinge marketing focuses on its "designed to be deleted" theme; when two Hinge users fall in love, the app's mascot Hingie is shown being destroyed in various ways such as getting roasted in a campfire, encased in ice, run over by a taxi, or flattened by an air conditioning unit. In 2020, the app launched Hingie Shop, selling products that can be "destroyed," such as bath bombs and s'mores, in addition to apparel and jewelry.

After a video made by Gina DiVittorio titled "The ideal woman according to guys' Hinge profiles" went viral in 2019, the company hired DiVittorio to star in a web series called Cheap Date, which featured her trying and reviewing date ideas that cost less than $20. The series was nominated for a 2020 Webby Award in the "Social Culture & Lifestyle (Video)" category.

See also

Comparison of online dating services
Timeline of online dating services

References

External links

Computer-related introductions in 2012
Geosocial networking
Mobile social software
Online dating applications
Online dating services of the United States
Proprietary cross-platform software